Petrohué Waterfalls (pronounced petro-WEH) is a chute-type waterfall in the upper reach of Petrohué River in Chile, a short distance downstream of the source of this river in Todos los Santos Lake. This waterfall is inside the Vicente Pérez Rosales National Park, close to the road leading to the Petrohue locality on lake Todos los Santos. Tourists on the international route between Puerto Montt in Chile and Bariloche in Argentina are generally offered a stop for a walk to enjoy the sights.

The waterfall is supported by basaltic lava (andesite) stemming from the Osorno Volcano that sits in between Todos los Santos and Llanquihue Lake and provides an interesting background for pictures. The average water flow of these falls is of 270 m3 per second, but it can be much larger during the rainy season when the surface level of lake Todos los Santos rises by up to 3 meters. The water, decanted in the lake, is usually clear with a green hue; however, occasionally, when lahars descending from the volcano are active, water at the falls can be loaded with sand and silt. Transport of these abrasive materials explains the polished aspect of the rocks.

Attentive visitors may spot a couple of torrent ducks mastering the rapids, with their chicks when in season.

External links
Petrohué waterfalls (1040x780 pixels)

Waterfalls of Chile
Landforms of Los Lagos Region
Tourist attractions in Los Lagos Region